Township High School District 214 is located in Cook County, Illinois. It is the state's second largest high school district by enrollment. Its headquarters are in Arlington Heights. The district serves most of Wheeling Township and Elk Grove Township, and a small part of Palatine Township.

Schools

 Buffalo Grove High School opened 1973
 Elk Grove High School opened 1966
 John Hersey High School opened 1968
 Prospect High School opened 1957
 Rolling Meadows High School opened 1971
 Wheeling High School opened 1964

Former schools
 Arlington High School opened 1922 closed 1984
 Forest View High School opened 1962 closed 1986

Feeder school districts
 Arlington Heights School District 25
 Buffalo Grove-Wheeling Community Consolidated School District 21
 Mount Prospect School District 57
 Prospect Heights School District 23
 River Trails School District 26 (almost all of)
 Community Consolidated School District 59
 Palatine Community Consolidated School District 15 (some)

References

External links

Township High School District 214 webpage

School districts in Cook County, Illinois
Arlington Heights, Illinois
Mount Prospect, Illinois